Daydream Nation is the fifth full-length studio album and first double album by American alternative rock band Sonic Youth, released on October 18, 1988. The band recorded the album between July and August 1988 at Greene St. Recording in New York City, and it was released by Enigma Records as a double album.

After Daydream Nation was released, it received widespread acclaim from critics and earned Sonic Youth a major label deal. The album was ranked high in critics' year-end lists of 1988's best records, being voted second in The Village Voices annual Pazz & Jop poll. Daydream Nation has since been widely considered to be Sonic Youth's greatest work, as well as one of the greatest albums of all time, specifically having a profound influence on the alternative and indie rock genres. It was chosen by the Library of Congress to be preserved in the National Recording Registry in 2005.

Writing and recording
Sonic Youth's standard songwriting method involved Thurston Moore bringing in melody ideas and chord changes that the band would spend several months fashioning into full-length songs. Instead of paring the songs down as the group did with previous records, the months-long writing process for Daydream Nation resulted in long jams, some lasting over half an hour. Several friends of the band, including Henry Rollins, had praised the band's long live improvisations and told the group that its records never captured them. With Moore on a writing spree, the album ultimately had to be expanded to a double album.

Sonic Youth recorded Daydream Nation at New York's Greene Street basement studio. The studio's engineer, Nick Sansano, was accustomed to working with hip hop artists. Sansano did not know much about Sonic Youth, but he was aware the band had an aggressive sound, so he showed the band members his work on Public Enemy's "Black Steel in the Hour of Chaos" and Rob Base and DJ E-Z Rock's "It Takes Two". The group embraced the sound of the records. Sonic Youth booked three weeks of recording time at Greene Street's Studio A, starting in mid-July 1988. The band paid $1,000 per day of studio time, which was the most they had paid to record an album up to that point.

Due to the amount of preparation the band put into composing its music, the recording process was efficient. The session became rushed near the end, when Paul Smith, the head of the band's British label Blast First, had set a mastering date of August 18. As a result of the time pressure, Kim Gordon was not happy with some of her vocal takes. The band spent a whole night creating a final mix for the three-song "Trilogy" so it could be mastered the following morning. The record ultimately cost $30,000, which led Moore to refer to the album as "our first non-econo record".

Music and lyrics
Daydream Nation is generally considered an avant-rock, alternative rock, indie rock, art punk, and post-punk album, with the record being notable for its unorthodox guitar tuning and song structure, with many songs concluding with
lengthy instrumental sections. The album is especially notable for being a significant influence for later alternative and indie rock efforts and genres, including well-known grunge band Nirvana. Lyrics include topics of burnout, the music industry, and the crack epidemic of the late 1980s.

"The Sprawl" was inspired by the works of science fiction writer William Gibson, who used the term to refer to a future mega-city stretching from Boston to Atlanta (specifically from the Sprawl Trilogy). The lyrics for the first verse were lifted from the novel The Stars at Noon by Denis Johnson. "'Cross the Breeze" features some of Gordon's most intense singing, with such lyrics as "Let's go walking on the water/Now you think I'm Satan's daughter/I wanna know, should I stay or go?/I took a look into your hate/It made me feel very up to date". "Eric's Trip" has lyrics pertaining to Eric Emerson's LSD-fueled monologue in the Andy Warhol movie Chelsea Girls.

"Hey Joni" is titled as a tribute to rock standard "Hey Joe" and to Canadian singer-songwriter Joni Mitchell. It is sung by Ranaldo, and has surrealist lyrics such as "Shots ring out from the center of an empty field/Joni's in the tall grass/She's a beautiful mental jukebox, a sailboat explosion/A snap of electric whipcrack". This song also alludes to the works of William Gibson's Neuromancer with the line "In this broken town, can you still jack in/And know what to do?" These feature similarly on Ranaldo's two other songs on the album, the rarely played "Rain King"—an homage to Pere Ubu and perhaps Saul Bellow's Henderson the Rain King—and the aforementioned "Eric's Trip".

"Providence" consisted of a piano solo by Moore recorded at his mother's house using a Walkman, the sound of a Peavey Roadmaster amp overheating and a pair of telephone messages left by Mike Watt, calling for Moore from a Providence, Rhode Island payphone, dubbed over one another.

The title of "The Wonder" comes from crime fiction writer James Ellroy's phrase about the ineffable mystery at the heart of Los Angeles; in Moore's words, "the wonder" is what "for better and worse, inspires [Ellroy] to keep going, to get out of bed every day." The closing track "Eliminator Jr." was inspired by the "Preppie Killer", Robert Chambers. It was thus titled because the band felt it sounded like a cross between Dinosaur Jr. and Eliminator-era ZZ Top. It was given part "z" in the "Trilogy" both as a reference to ZZ Top and because it is the closing piece on the disc.

Title and packaging 

Daydream Nations title came from a lyric in the song "Hyperstation". Sonic Youth had also considered the title "Tonight's the Day", from a lyric in "Candle", which made reference to Neil Young's 1975 album Tonight's the Night. The cover for Daydream Nation features the 1983 Gerhard Richter painting Kerze ("Candle"). The back cover art is a similar Richter painting from 1982. The vinyl version's four sides and the compact disc inner tray contain four symbols each representing one of the members of the band, in an homage to—and parody of—the four symbols from the fourth Led Zeppelin album. The symbols are infinity (∞), female (♀), uppercase omega (Ω), and a drawing of a demonic–angelic baby holding drumsticks.

Release and promotion
Daydream Nation was released on October 18, 1988, in compact disc, cassette and double vinyl formats. It did not chart in the United States, but reached No. 99 on the British albums chart. Three singles with accompanying music videos were also released: "Teen Age Riot" (in 1988 on 12-inch vinyl and CD), "Providence" (in the United Kingdom in 1989), "Candle" (October 1989 on 12-inch vinyl), and a live version of "Silver Rocket" for subscribers to Forced Exposure. The song "Teen Age Riot" was popular on alternative radio and reached No. 20 on Billboard's newly created Modern Rock Tracks chart. Sonic Youth also promoted the album with a North American tour from October to December 1988, concentrating almost exclusively on material from the album. In 1989, they took the tour to New Zealand, Australia, Japan, the USSR and Europe, finishing the year with their first network television appearance—on the syndicated Night Music—playing "Silver Rocket". In 2007 they played the album live as part of the Don't Look Back concert series, and then toured with it through Europe and Australia into 2008.

Reception and legacy 

Daydream Nation received overwhelming acclaim from contemporary critics. Billboard called it "the supreme fulfillment" of Sonic Youth's "fullbore technique". Giving the album an "A" grade in The Village Voice, Robert Christgau believed that while the band were embracing a "happy-go-lucky careerism and four-on-the-floor maturity", their relentlessly discordant music was "a philosophical triumph". Rolling Stone'''s Robert Palmer rated it three-and-a-half stars out of five and said it demonstrated "the broad harmonic palette, sharply honed songwriting skills and sheer exhilarating drive" of the "influential quartet", while presenting "the definitive American guitar band of the Eighties at the height of its powers and prescience".

The British music press also embraced Daydream Nation: Q magazine said the record made an "enthralling noise"; the NME called it the "most radical and political album of the year" and awarded it a maximum score of ten; and Record Mirror gave it a five-out-of-five rating, enthusing that Sonic Youth were "the best band in the universe".

At the end of 1988, Daydream Nation appeared in several lists of the year's best albums, being ranked at No. 2 by Rolling Stone, No. 1 by CMJ, and No. 9 by NME. It was also voted the year's second best record in The Village Voices annual Pazz & Jop poll, which made the band realize that the album had made an impact. Christgau, the poll's creator and supervisor, named it the fourth best album of 1988 in his own list.Daydream Nation has continued to earn acclaim and accolades. According to Matthew Stearns, writer of the 33⅓ book dedicated to the album, it has been "resoundingly canonized as a breakthrough landmark in the chronicles of avant-rock expression". Stearns wrote that Daydream Nation comprised the "Holy Trinity" of early indie rock double albums with Hüsker Dü's Zen Arcade and Minutemen's Double Nickels on the Dime, judging that the three works "together mark a period of unprecedented creative expansion in terms of the possibilities of underground (or otherwise) American rock music".

In a retrospective review for AllMusic, Stephen Thomas Erlewine deemed it "a masterpiece of post-punk art rock" that demonstrated the degree of which "noise and self-conscious avant art can be incorporated into rock, and the results are nothing short of stunning". Jon Matsumoto of the Los Angeles Times called it the band's masterpiece and said they had developed first-rate songwriting skills to complement their penchant for dissonant instrumentation.

Greg Kot, writing in the Chicago Tribune, called it one of the most recognizable albums of the 1980s with its combination of "hypnotic guitar jams and some of the band's best, straight-ahead tunes". Reviewing the 2007 deluxe edition, Christgau credited Daydream Nation for making alternative rock "a life force" and remarked that, along with the "vital" bonus disc, the album remained an honest and thrilling listen because of its musical tunings and anthemic songs about post-irony and "confusion-as-sex". In Spin, Will Hermes said it was perhaps "the greatest art-punk statement ever", while John Mulvey from Uncut called it a still radical "avant-rock masterpiece".

In 2002, Pitchfork ranked Daydream Nation No. 1 on its list of the 100 greatest albums of the 1980s (the album dropped to No. 7 in the 2018 list). It also placed at No.13 on Spin magazine's list of the 100 greatest albums from 1985 to 2010, No. 30 on Slant Magazines "Best Albums of the 1980s" and No. 45 on the Rolling Stone list of the 100 greatest albums of the 1980s. The Spin Alternative Record Guide (1995) named it the ninth best alternative album, and it was ranked 11th on Guitarists 2000 list of the 101 essential guitar records. In 2003, the album was placed at No. 328 on Rolling Stone's list of the 500 greatest albums ever, and again in 2012, with the album being ranked number 171 in the 2020 edition.

Daydream Nation was one of 50 recordings chosen by the Library of Congress to be added to the National Recording Registry in 2006. PopMatters included it in their list of the "12 Essential 1980s Alternative Rock Albums", saying it was "an ambitious double album that saw Sonic Youth's various influences coalescing into a striking, searing whole". The album was also included in the book 1001 Albums You Must Hear Before You Die.

"Daydream Nation," remarked David Bowie, "is an extraordinary album."

Track listing

 On some editions of the album, including all digital releases, all parts of “Trilogy” are separated as their own tracks.

Deluxe Edition
A deluxe edition of Daydream Nation was released in 2007, containing live versions of every track on the album, plus studio recordings of some cover songs. A 4-LP vinyl version was released on July 17, 2007.

The four-LP vinyl release of the deluxe edition has a slightly different track listing than the CD release. The first two LPs have the same track listing as the original double-LP release. However, the home demo of "Eric's Trip" is at the end of the fourth LP, rather than falling immediately after the original album.

Personnel
Sonic Youth
Thurston Moore – guitar, vocals, piano, production
Kim Gordon – bass guitar, guitar, vocals, production
Lee Ranaldo – guitar, vocals, production
Steve Shelley – drums, production

Production
Nick Sansano – production, engineering
Howie Weinberg – mastering
Dave Swanson – engineering assistance
Michael Lavine – photography
Matt Tritto – engineering assistance

Charts

ReferencesBibliography'''

External links

Daydream Nation (Adobe Flash) at Radio3Net (streamed copy where licensed)

1988 albums
Sonic Youth albums
Au Go Go Records albums
Blast First albums
DGC Records albums
Geffen Records albums
Albums recorded at Greene St. Recording
United States National Recording Registry recordings
United States National Recording Registry albums
Art punk albums